Meti is a term used, in the country of Nepal, referring to a feminine displaying and masculine bodied individual. Metis are a part of a larger group of queer individuals in Nepal referred to as anya.

Metis are an officially recognized third gender in the country of Nepal as of a Supreme Court ruling in 2007. As of this Supreme Court ruling, metis are able to be officially recognized by the Nepalese government and able to have a government-issued ID card listing “both” as an option under “gender." This also set a precedent of using self-determination as a source of proof in determining a person eligibility in establishing a gender on government documents.

Discrimination 
Discrimination is a common issue among self-identified meti individuals. In 2004, 39 meti individuals were arrested and detained for "spreading perversion" and furthermore were unable to receive due process, as a result of the lack of LGBT support among Nepalese laws.

Meti are commonly associated with the Blue Diamond Society of Nepal. The society is an LGBT rights association devoted to crusading for the rights of marginalized LGBTQ+ individuals.

HIV 
The HIV epidemic prevalent in Nepal is especially concentrated among the meti community. This can be attributed to the unique struggle that Meti face finding employment and acceptance in society. Many meti are pushed into the sex-industry working as prostitutes and are unwelcome in any other roles in society. As with issues of discrimination, the key to starting to solve the HIV epidemic among meti is making knowledge readily available and educating about safe-sex methods.

References

External links 
 http://williamsinstitute.law.ucla.edu/wp-content/uploads/Nepal-Survey-Oct-2014.pdf

Transgender in Asia
Transgender identities